Sarah Iles Johnston (born 25 October 1957) is an American academic working at Ohio State University. She is primarily known for her research into ancient Greek myths and religion, focusing on how myths helped to create and sustain belief in the gods; ancient ideas about what happened to the soul after death and how the dead and the living could interact; magic; and divination. Especially in her later work, she includes comparisons between ancient Greek ideas and practices and those of other cultures, both Mediterranean and non-Mediterranean. She also studies ghost stories from 1830s to present day, attempting to understand why they frighten and how this interlinks with religious belief.

Education 
Johnston attended the University of Kansas where she received her B.S. in Journalism in 1979, followed shortly by her B.A. in Classics in 1980. She then attended Cornell University, where she also worked as a teaching assistant, to complete her M.A. in Classics in 1983 and her PhD in 1987, where she studied ancient Greek myths and religions.

Career 
Johnston began her teaching career proper when she accepted the post of lecturer in Classics at Princeton University, where she worked from 1987 to 1988. Since then, she has held a number of positions at Ohio State University, including assistant professor of Classics (1988–1995), associate professor of Greek and Latin (1995–2000) and professor of Greek and Latin (2000–). In 2011 she was named the Arts and Humanities Distinguished Professor of Religion at Ohio State, and in 2017 she was named the College of Arts and Sciences Distinguished Professor of Religion. She holds a professorship in Ohio State's Department of Classics.

She also was the founding director of the Center for the Study of Religion at Ohio State (2006–2010).

Her scholarly books include The Story of Myth (2018), Ancient Greek Divination (2008), Ritual Texts for the Afterlife: Orpheus and the Bacchic Gold Tablets (2007, with Fritz Graf), Restless Dead: Encounters Between the Living and the Dead in Ancient Greece (1999) and Hekate Soteira (1990). Additionally, she has also been an editor for a number of collections, including Narrating Religion (2017), Religions of the Ancient World: A Guide (2004) and Ancient Religions (2007), and she has authored a number of articles and essays for Classical journals.

In 2022, her first book for the general public, Gods and Mortals: Ancient Greek Myths for Modern Readers, will be published.

Publications

Books 
 Gods and Mortals: Ancient Greek Myths for Modern Readers (Princeton Univ. Press: 2022).
 The Story of Myth (Harvard Univ. Press: 2018).
 Ancient Greek Divination (Wiley-Blackwell: 2008). 
 With Fritz Graf, Ritual Texts for the Afterlife: Orpheus and the Bacchic Gold Tablets (Routledge: 2007; second edition 2013). 
 Restless Dead: Encounters Between the Living and the Dead in Ancient Greece (University of California Press: 1999). 
 Hekate Soteira (Amer. Class. Studies #21) (Scholars' Press: 1990; now published by Oxford University Press).

Edited volumes 
 Narrating Religion (MacMillan: 2017). 
 Ancient Religions (Harvard University Press: 2007). 
 Co-Editor (with Peter T. Struck) Mantikê: Studies in Ancient Divination. Religions in the Greco-Roman World. vol. 155 (Brill: 2005).
 Religions of the Ancient World: A Guide (Harvard University Press: 2004). 
 Co-Editor (with James J. Clauss) Medea: Essays on Medea in Myth, Literature, Philosophy and Art (Princeton University Press: 1997).

References

External links 
 Academic Staff Page, Ohio State University
  Academia.edu page

1957 births
Living people
20th-century American historians
Cornell University alumni
American classical scholars
Women classical scholars
American women historians
20th-century American women
21st-century American women